Durga Prasad Yadav is an Indian politician serving as a member of the Legislative Assembly of Uttar Pradesh. He is also a former transport minister and forest minister. He represents the Azamgarh constituency of Uttar Pradesh and is a member of the Samajwadi Party.

Personal life
Yadav was born 12 January 1954 in Aahopatti, Azamgarh district, Uttar Pradesh to his father Ram Dhyan Yadav. He graduated with a Bachelor of Arts degree from Shibli National College, Azamgarh under Gorakhpur University in 1981 and attained a Bachelor of Law degree from Shibli National College, Azamgarh under Veer Bahadur Singh Purvanchal University in 1991.

Political career
Durga Prasad Yadav has been a MLA since 1985. He represented the Azamgarh constituency and is a member of the Samajwadi Party.

Posts held

See also
Azamgarh
Politics of India
Sixteenth Legislative Assembly of Uttar Pradesh
Uttar Pradesh Legislative Assembly

References 

1954 births
Living people
Samajwadi Party politicians
Uttar Pradesh MLAs 2012–2017
Uttar Pradesh MLAs 2017–2022
People from Azamgarh district
Uttar Pradesh MLAs 2022–2027